Robert Mather  (28 September 1914 – 5 February 2002) was an Australian politician.

He was born in Hobart. In 1964 he was elected to the Tasmanian House of Assembly as a Liberal member for Denison. He served until his retirement in 1982. He was appointed a Commander of the Order of the British Empire in 1984.

References

1914 births
2002 deaths
Liberal Party of Australia members of the Parliament of Tasmania
Members of the Tasmanian House of Assembly
Commanders of the Order of the British Empire
20th-century Australian politicians